= Karwalian =

Coordinates: 31°52′N 75°11′E

- Village
- Interactive map of Karwalian
- Country: India
- State: Punjab
- District: Gurdaspur
- Tehsil: Batala
- Region: Majha

Government
  - Type: Panchayat raj
  - Body: Gram panchayat

Area
  - Total: 130 ha (320 acres)

Population (2011)
  - Total: 773; 407/366 ♂/♀
  - Scheduled Castes: 449; 242/207 ♂/♀
  - Total Households: 143

Languages
  - Official: Punjabi
- Time zone: UTC+5:30 (IST)
- Telephone: 01871
- ISO 3166 code: IN-PB
- Vehicle registration: PB-18
- Website: gurdaspur.nic.in

Karwalian is a village in Batala in Gurdaspur district of Punjab State, India. It is located 5 kilometres (3.1 mi) from sub district headquarter, 38 kilometres (24 mi) from district headquarter and is located on Dera Baba Nanak road 5 km from batala. The village is administrated by Sarpanch an elected representative of the village. The current sarpanch of village is Satnam Singh Sangha.

== Demography ==
As of 2011, the village has a total number of 143 houses and a population of 773 of which 407 are males while 366 are females. According to the report published by Census India in 2011, out of the total population of the village 449 people are from Schedule Caste and the village does not have any Schedule Tribe population so far.

== See also ==
- List of villages in India
